Damour is a Lebanese Christian town that is  south of Beirut. The name of the town is derived from the name of the Phoenician god Damoros who symbolized immortality ( in Arabic). Damour also remained the capital of Mount Lebanon for three centuries.

Geography 
The city is located in one of the few flat areas of the Lebanese coast. It is built to the north of the river, the ancient Tamyrus, which bears its name on a dune overlooking the Mediterranean. It is surrounded by plantations of bananas and vegetable crops. The Beirut-Tyre Highway separates the plantations. Now dismantled, the track is a stopover.

Climate 
Damour has a mild mediterranean climate (Köppen climate classification: Csa).

Churches 
There exist six churches in Damour, of which Notre-Dame de Damour and St Élias are the biggest. There are  also three other chapels, including  Sainte Thècle, St Michel, which was the first church in Damour, St Maroun, which is under reconstruction, and St Joseph. These six churches are all Maronite Churches. Before the Lebanese Civil War, Damour had another Catholic church, Savior's Church. Most of the population is Maronite Catholic

Tourism 
Because Damour is one of the few cities of the Lebanese coast having a sand beach, and since it is ten minutes from Beirut, Damour attracts tourists and especially water sports enthusiasts. Thus several restaurants, coffees and snacks are located along the beach. There are also a few restaurants at the edges of the Damour river.

History 

In the 19th century, Damour was the a flourishing center of the Chouf region. Its plain was then planted with mulberry and had twelve large manufacturing companies. Ten thousand workers and technicians worked in the natural silk industry. The city has a real fascination for the Lebanese worker and attracts the largest majority of the natives in the Sahel region.

During the last centuries, Damour was located on the central axis of fighting and successive wars.

In 1302, after the Mamluks took Arwad Island, on 8 June the same year, the Cypriots landed on the Damour River. A battle took place between the Emir Fakhr al - Din Abdel - Hamid bin Jamaluddin Altnokhi, his brother the Emir Shams al - Din Abdullah accompanied by an army of Muslims against the Cypriot. The battle was won by Crusaders. Fakhr Din Emir was killed, while his brother Shams al - Din fell hostage. He was released after five days for a ransom of three thousand dinars tyriens.

In May 1860, Druze forces committed a massacre of the people.

During the nights of the first world war, inhabitants met the armoured French cruiser Jeanne d'Arc sailors and received medicines, food and other needed supplies.

In 1941, Damour was the French administrative capital. The city being a strategic crossing point on the road to Beirut, 21 July 1941, was the place of one of the battles that affected Lebanon during World War II  Syria-Lebanon Campaign. Australian troops, progressing towards the North along the coast, took Damour, held by the French Foreign Legion, faithful to the Vichy Government. A cease-fire was concluded at the end of the battle. There were no more obstacles in the direction of Beirut.

In 1942, South African army engineers built a railway line from Haifa to Beirut along the coast and Australian engineers continued the line to Tripoli. <Orpen N & Martin H J. Salute the Sappers, part 1. 1981 Johannesburg. > The line is no longer in use.

On January 9, 1976, Palestinians laid siege to the city. On January 20, 1976, thousands of Palestinians committed a massacre of the inhabitants. See Damour Massacre.

During Israeli invasion of 1982, the Israeli air force bombed the city which was under the control of the Palestinian militias.

During the Israeli conflict of 2006, the Israeli air force destroyed several bridges on Highway Beirut-Tyre and on the Damour River.

The Historical Bridge 
The history of the archeological bridge dates back to the era of prince-Béchir Shehab who had a great interest in it, it was considered a strategic and important transit point between Mt Lebanon and the South.

Neighborhoods 
 Mar Thecla El Naame
 Mar Mikhael Al Damour
 Khiyam Al Damour
 Saadiyat
 Ghandouriyeh
 Missiar

Notable People
 Ghada Georges Aoun
 Elie Saab
Nassib Al Matni (Journalist killed 1958)
 Michel Aoun
 Georges Akl
 Rose Ghorayeb - renowned Lebanese author and literary critic
 Michel Farid Ghrayeb
 Georges Asaad Aoun
Aziz Al Matni (Journalist/writer)
 Marwan Al Matni (Journalist)
 Said Ghorayeb (Journalist/Television Presenter)
 Michel Azzi (Television Presenter)
 Michel Azzi (Singer)
 Nadine Saab (Singer)
 Joseph Hashem - Zaghloul al-Damour (Zajal Poet)
 Geryes Boustani (Zajal Poet)
 Mario Aoun (Minister)
 Dani Fadel (Scientific Researcher)

Gallery

See also 
 Damour river
 Battle of Damour (1941)
 Damour massacre
 Damour notable natives

References

Bibliography
Robert Fisk, Pity the Nation, André Deutsch Ltd. 1990,

External links
Damour,  Localiban

Populated places in Chouf District
Maronite Christian communities in Lebanon